Andrés Avelino Zapico Junquera (23 April 1946 – 6 May 2019) was a Spanish professional footballer who played as a goalkeeper.

Club career
Born in La Felguera, Langreo, Asturias, Junquera started his senior career with local club UP Langreo in Segunda División. He signed with Real Madrid in 1966, making his La Liga debut on 10 September 1967 in a 2–0 away win against Sevilla FC.

During his spell at the Santiago Bernabéu Stadium, Junquera won the national championship five times, adding three Copa del Generalísimo trophies and the Ricardo Zamora Trophy in the 1967–68 season. He added seven appearances in the UEFA European Cup.

Junquera joined Real Zaragoza in the summer of 1975, being relegated to the second level in 1976–77 but winning promotion the following campaign. He retired due to a meniscus injury in 1978, at the age of 32.

Later life and death
After retiring from football, Junquera ran a hospitality business in Sama.

The 73-year-old suffered a heart attack on 6 May 2019, being pronounced dead at the Valle del Nalón Hospital in Riaño, Langreo the same day.

References

External links

1946 births
2019 deaths
Spanish footballers
Footballers from Asturias
Association football goalkeepers
La Liga players
Segunda División players
UP Langreo footballers
Real Madrid CF players
Real Zaragoza players